Theobald III (13 May 1179 – 24 May 1201) was Count of Champagne from 1197 to his death. He was designated heir by his older brother Henry II when the latter went to the Holy Land on the Third Crusade, and succeeded him upon his death. He cooperated closely with his uncle and suzerain King Philip II of France. He died young, and was succeeded by a posthumous son, Theobald IV, while his widow, Blanche of Navarre, ruled as regent.

Family

Theobald III was the younger son of Count Henry I of Champagne and Marie of France. He succeeded as count of Champagne in 1197 upon the death of his older brother Henry II. Theobald married Blanche of Navarre on 1 July 1199 at Chartres. They had two children, a daughter, Marie, and a son, Theobald IV, born after Theobald III's death.

Rule
Charters were written by Theobald and King Philip II of France in September 1198 to dictate the rights of the Jews of the one vis-à-vis the other and to repay debts by Philip to the count of Champagne for the employment of his Jews. These laws were reinforced subsequently in charters that were signed between 1198 and 1231.

In 1198, Pope Innocent III called the Fourth Crusade. There was little enthusiasm for the crusade at first, but on 28 November 1199 various nobles of France gathered at Theobald's court for a tournament (in his castle at Ecry-sur-Aisne), including the preacher Fulk of Neuilly. There, they "took the cross", and elected Theobald their leader, but he died in 1201 and was replaced by Boniface I, Marquess of Montferrat.

Following his death on 24 May 1201, Theobald's widow Blanche ruled Champagne as regent for the following 21 years, during which the succession was contested by Theobald's nieces Alice and Philippa, daughters of his predecessor, Henry II. Theobald was buried beside his father, Henry, at the Church of Saint Stephen at Troyes.

Genealogical table

Notes

References

Sources

Counts of Champagne
Christians of the Fourth Crusade
House of Blois
1201 deaths
1179 births
People from Troyes
13th-century peers of France